Usnu may refer to:
 Ushnu or usnu, a pyramid-shaped, terraced structure that was used by the Incas, Inca kings had a small "portable usnu" made of gold akin to a throne.
 Usnu, Ayacucho, an archaeological site in the Ayacucho Region, Peru
 Usnu, Huánuco, an archaeological site in the Huánuco Region, Peru